Nahuelito is a lake monster purported to live in Nahuel Huapi Lake, Patagonia, Argentina. Like Nessie, the Loch Ness Monster, the Argentine creature is named after the lake it supposedly resides in and has been described as a giant serpent or a huge hump, as well as a plesiosaur. Nahuelito has been allegedly shown through photos showing a hump, or a serpentine body.

History
Its name means yaguarete, which is a large felid species from the Americas. The origin of the current legend is believed to go back to indigenous stories prior to the period of the conquest of America. The first colonizers obtained from the native population stories about the occasional encounters with aquatic monsters. In 1897, Dr. Clemente Onelli, director of the Buenos Aires Zoo, began to receive sporadic reports about a possible strange creature inhabiting the Patagonian lakes.
In 1910, George Garret worked at a company located near the Nahuel Huapi. Commenting on his experience with local people, Garret learned of similar stories told by the indigenous people. But Garret's sighting in 1910 was only made public in 1922, when he recounted it to the Toronto Globe newspaper and echoed in the international press, thus motivating himself to organize the first expedition to search for Nahuelito. The small lake where the presence of the creature was claimed is known today as Laguna del Plesiosaurio (Plesiosaur's lagoon).
More recently, in 1960, the Argentine Navy was said to have chased an unidentified underwater object in the lake for 18 days, without being able to identify it, which some people related to this alleged creature. In 1988, photos of the Nahuelito were published in a magazine of the Río Negro newspaper. These were taken at a short distance with an analog camera, in which the object was near the coast of Bariloche. "It is not a log of whimsical shapes. It is not a wave. El Nahuelito showed his face" said a man, who did not reveal his name, in a letter he left with the photos.

References 

Argentine folklore
Water monsters
Spanish-language South American legendary creatures